Gumti, Gomti, Gumati or Gomati (gomtī/gomôtī) is a river flowing through the north-eastern Indian state of Tripura and the district of Comilla in Bangladesh. A dam has been constructed near Dumbur on the river that has formed a lake covering .

Gallery

References

External links

Rivers of Tripura
Rivers of Bangladesh
Rivers of India
Rivers of Chittagong Division
International rivers of Asia

simple:Gumti River